Friedenheimer Straße is an U-Bahn station in Munich on the U5.

References

Munich U-Bahn stations
Railway stations in Germany opened in 1988
1988 establishments in West Germany